Percy Markham Lewis (13 March 1864 – 24 November 1922) was an Australian cricketer. A wicket-keeper, he played 32 first-class cricket matches for Victoria between 1883 and 1896.

References

External links
 

1864 births
1922 deaths
Australian cricketers
Cricketers from Tasmania
Victoria cricketers
Wicket-keepers